Broaden Media Academy was a film and video post-production training facility in Taipei, Taiwan. The faculty included award-winning professionals and Apple-certified trainers offering courses on standard software packages such as Avid, Final Cut Pro, Apple Motion, DVD Studio Pro, Pro Tools and Shake.

Schools in Taipei
Culture in Taipei
Film organizations in Taiwan